Loukas Paraskeva is a Cypriot international lawn bowler.

Bowls career
Paraskeva was selected as part of the two man team by Cyprus for the 2016 World Outdoor Bowls Championship, which was held in Avonhead, Christchurch, New Zealand.

He won a triples bronze medal at the 2011 Atlantic Bowls Championships and has won eight titles at the Cypriot National Championships.

References

Living people
Cypriot bowls players
Year of birth missing (living people)